Sarel is a masculine given name and a surname. It is a variant of Carel, Charel and Charl, themselves a variant of Charles. Notable people with the name include:

First name 
Sarel Burger (b. 1983), Namibian cricketer
Sarel Cilliers (1801–1871), Voortrekker leader and preacher
Sarel de Jong (b. 1996), Dutch kickboxer
Sarel Erwee (b. 1989), South African cricketer
Sarel Pretorius (b. 1984), South African rugby player
Sarel van der Merwe (b. 1946), South African rally and racing driver
Sarel Wolmarans (b. 1973), South African cricketer

Last name 
Henry Sarel (1823–1887), Lieutenant Governor of Guernsey 1883–1885
Sydney Sarel (1872–1950), British track and field athlete
William Godfrey Molyneux Sarel (1875–1950), English British Army officer and cricketer
William Samuel Sarel (1861–1933), British civil servant

Afrikaans-language given names